Gutów may refer to:

 Gutów, Greater Poland Voivodeship, Poland
 Gutów, Masovian Voivodeship, Poland
 Gutów Duży, Łódź Voivodeship, Poland
 Gutów Mały, Łódź Voivodeship, Poland

See also
 Gutow (disambiguation)
 Gutowo (disambiguation)